Harry Walter "H.W." Tyler (April 16, 1863 – February 3, 1938) was an active member of the science and education scholarly communities in the late 19th and early 20th centuries. After receiving his Bachelor of Science degree from the Massachusetts Institute of Technology (MIT) in 1884, he taught and served in various administrative positions at the Institute from 1884 until his retirement in 1930.

Career
Outside of MIT he was a founding member of both the College Entrance Examination Board in 1901 and the History of Science Society in 1924. 

He served as Secretary of the American Association of University Professors (AAUP) for twenty years. 

After retiring from MIT he worked in Washington D.C. at the Library of Congress as Consultant in Science, and later as Honorary Consultant.

See also
MIT Mathematics Department

References

1863 births
1938 deaths
People from Ipswich, Massachusetts
Massachusetts Institute of Technology alumni
University of Erlangen-Nuremberg alumni
Massachusetts Institute of Technology faculty
American chemists
Library of Congress